Rouse Properties was a real estate investment trust headquartered in New York City. The company owned 35 shopping malls in 22 states encompassing approximately 24.5 million square feet of retail space.

History
In 2011, General Growth Properties announced that it would spin off a portfolio of 30 shopping malls as a new company named Rouse Properties. The name was taken from the Rouse Company, which GGP had acquired in 2004. The portfolio comprised most of GGP's Class B shopping centers (malls located in smaller cities, and second-tier malls in larger cities), allowing GGP to focus on its higher-performing properties. The spin-off was completed on January 12, 2012.

In February 2012, the company acquired Grand Traverse Mall for $66 million.

In January 2013, the company acquired The Mall at Turtle Creek in Jonesboro, Arkansas for $96 million.

In May 2014, the company began a $40 million renovation of NewPark Mall in Newark, California.

In March 2015, the company defaulted a loan secured by Vista Ridge Mall in Lewisville, Texas.

In November 2015, the company acquired The Shoppes at Carlsbad in Carlsbad, California.

In 2016, Brookfield Asset Management, which owned 33 percent of Rouse Properties, made an unsolicited offer to purchase the rest of the company. A purchase agreement was eventually reached, valuing the company at $2.8 billion. Brookfield's acquisition of Rouse Properties was completed on July 6, 2016.

In 2018, Brookfield also acquired GGP. Ultimately the Rouse Properties brand was absorbed into Brookfield Properties.

Properties 

 Animas Valley Mall — Farmington, New Mexico
 Bayshore Mall — Eureka, California
 Bel Air Mall — Mobile, Alabama
 Birchwood Mall — Fort Gratiot Township, Michigan
 Cache Valley Mall — Logan, Utah
 Centre at Salisbury — Salisbury, Maryland
 Chesterfield Towne Center — Chesterfield, Virginia
 Chula Vista Center — Chula Vista, California
 Fig Garden Village — Fresno, California
 Gateway Mall — Springfield, Oregon
 Grand Traverse Mall — Traverse City, Michigan
 Greenville Mall — Greenville, North Carolina
 Independence Mall — Wilmington, North Carolina
 Lakeland Square Mall — Lakeland, Florida
 Lansing Mall — Lansing, Michigan
 The Mall at Barnes Crossing — Tupelo, Mississippi
 The Mall at Sierra Vista — Sierra Vista, Arizona
 The Mall at Turtle Creek — Jonesboro, Arkansas
 Mall St. Vincent — Shreveport, Louisiana
 Monmouth Mall — Eatontown, New Jersey
 Mt. Shasta Mall — Redding, California
 NewPark Mall — Newark, California
 North Plains Mall — Clovis, New Mexico
 Pierre Bossier Mall — Bossier City, Louisiana
 Sikes Senter — Wichita Falls, Texas
 Silver Lake Mall — Coeur D'Alene, Idaho
 Southland Mall — Hayward, California
 The Shoppes at Carlsbad — Carlsbad, California
 The Shops at Somerset Square — Glastonbury, Connecticut
 Southland Center — Taylor, Michigan
 Spring Hill Mall — West Dundee, Illinois
 Three Rivers Mall — Kelso, Washington
 Valley Hills Mall — Hickory, North Carolina
 Washington Park Mall — Bartlesville, Oklahoma
 West Valley Mall — Tracy, California
 Westwood Mall — Jackson, Michigan
 White Mountain Mall — Rock Springs, Wyoming

References

2011 establishments in New York (state)
2016 mergers and acquisitions
Companies established in 2011
Defunct real estate companies of the United States
Rouse family